The Splendid Coward is a 1918 British silent crime film directed by F. Martin Thornton and starring James Knight, Joan Legge and Roy Travers.

Cast
 James Knight as Dick Swinton  
 Joan Legge as Dora Dundas  
 Roy Travers as Vivian Ormsby  
 Winifred Evans as Lady Mary Swinton 
 Clifford Pembroke as Rev. Swinton  
 Sydney Lewis Ransome as Trimmer  
 Jeff Barlow as Earl of Heresford  
 Thomas Canning as Col. Dundas  
 Teddy Arundell as Jack Lorimer

References

Bibliography
 Goble, Alan. The Complete Index to Literary Sources in Film. Walter de Gruyter, 1999.

External links

1918 films
British silent feature films
British crime drama films
1910s English-language films
Films directed by Floyd Martin Thornton
Films set in England
British black-and-white films
1918 crime drama films
1910s British films
Silent crime drama films